Elvis Franks (born July 9, 1957) is a former American football defensive end who played seven years in the National Football League.

Background
Franks was born on July 9, 1957 in Doucette, Texas. He attended Kirby High School in Woodville, Texas and college at Morgan State University in Baltimore, Maryland. He received a full athletic scholarship for track and field, but after being approached by a football coach, he began to play for the football team.

Controversy
In 1986, while he was a member of the Los Angeles Raiders, Franks was arrested in Warrensville Heights, Ohio, on a charge of possession of cocaine with intent to distribute. According to the Federal Bureau of Investigation, Franks attempted to sell the drug to an undercover agent.

References 

1957 births
American football defensive ends
Cleveland Browns players
Living people
Los Angeles Raiders players
Morgan State Bears football players
Morgan State University alumni
People from Tyler County, Texas
Players of American football from Texas